The chief firearms officer (CFO) is a Canadian official responsible for possession and acquisition licences, authorizations to transport, authorizations to carry, transfers of firearms, and gun show sponsorship approvals.

Each CFO oversees a designated province/region, specifically:

 Alberta — office in Edmonton
 British Columbia and Yukon —  office in Surrey, BC
 Manitoba and Nunavut — office in Winnipeg, MB
 New Brunswick — office in Fredericton
 Newfoundland and Labrador — office in St. John's
 Northwest Territories — office in Edmonton, AB
 Nova Scotia — office in Halifax
 Ontario — office in Orillia
 Prince Edward Island — office in Charlottetown
 Quebec — office in Montreal
 Saskatchewan — office in Saskatoon

References

External links
 Chief Firearms Officers, RCMP information page

Canadian firearms law
Gun politics in Canada
Royal Canadian Mounted Police